Peter Burman (Peter Ashley Thomas Insull Burman, MBE FSA, born Solihull, 15 September 1944) is a British architectural historian.

Education
He studied History of Art at King's College, Cambridge. In 1980 he participated in the Mural Paintings Conservation Course at ICCROM (International Centre for the Study of the Preservation and Restoration of Cultural Property) in Rome.

Career

From 1968 to 1990 he worked for the Council for the Care of Churches (now the Church Buildings Council) serving as its General Secretary from 1977 onwards. From 1990 to 2002 he was Director of the Centre for Conservation Studies, Department of Archaeology, University of York.
From 2002 to 2007, he was Director of Conservation and Property Services at the National Trust for Scotland. 
From 2007 to 2012 he was Professor of Cultural Heritage Management at the Department of World Heritage Studies, Brandenburg Technical University, Cottbus. From 2012 onwards he has continued to be active as an arts and heritage consultant, for clients which have included the Duke of Buccleuch and the Chapter of Lincoln Cathedral.

Other activities

He is a member of the Fabric Advisory Committee of St George's Chapel, Windsor Castle, and its Sculpture Committee.
From 2013 to 2015 he was Chair of the Garden History Society for Scotland.
He has a special interest in the use of building limes: he founded the Building Limes Forum for the United Kingdom in 1992, and served as its Convenor from 1992 to 2000.
In February 2015 he was elected Vice-Chair of the Built Environment Forum for Scotland.
He is a Guardian of the Society for the Protection of Ancient Buildings and chair of SPAB Scotland, a founding trustee of SAVE Britain's Heritage, and a Director of Ruskin's Guild of St George.
He is Chairman of the Falkland Stewardship Trust, Chairman of the Falkland Society, and Archivist and Trustee of Hopetoun House. In 2016 he was elected Chair of the Falkland Community Council. He is also a Companion of the Guild of St George.

Honours
In May 1974 he was elected a Fellow of the Society of Antiquaries of London. He received an MBE in the New Years Honours for 1990 as General Secretary of the Council for the Care of Churches. 
In 2003 he received an honorary doctorate of engineering (Dr.-Ing. e.h.) in monument conservation and architectural history (Denkmalpflege und Architekturgeschichte) from the Brandenburg Technical University, Cottbus. He is a member of the Art Workers' Guild.

Personal life
In June 2019 he married Ross Burgess in a Humanist ceremony in Falkland, Fife, followed a week later by a ceremony at the Unitarian Church in Croydon

Bibliography
Terry Friedman and Peter Burman, James Gibbs as a Church Designer: An Exhibition Celebrating the Restoration of the Cathedral Church of All Saints at Derby, 1972, Chapterhouse Press, 1972.
Peter Burman, "Inigo Jones at Hale" [Concerning Hale Church, Hampshire], Country Life, 7 February 1974.
Marcus Binney and Peter Burman, Chapels & Churches: Who Cares (British Tourist Authority, 1977). Hardback, 320 pages. .
Marcus Binney and Peter Burman, Change and Decay: Future of Our Churches (Littlehampton Book Services Ltd, 1977). Hardback, 208 pages. .
Peter Burman, "Small Town Stations", in Marcus Binney & David Pearce, Railway Architecture (Orbis Publishing Limited 1979, republished Bloomsbury Books, 1985).
Peter Burman, editor, Conservation of Wallpaintings: The International Scene (Council for the Care of Churches, 1986).
Peter Burman, St Paul's Cathedral (Bell & Hyman, The New Bell's Cathedral Guides. 1987) 
Peter Burman and Henry Stapleton, The Churchyards Handbook: Advice on the history and significance of churchyards, their care, improvement and maintenance (Church House Publishing for the Council for the Care of Churches. Third edition, 1988). .
Peter Burman, editor, Treasures on Earth: A good housekeeping guide to churches and their contents (Donhead, 1994). Hardback, 320 pages.
Peter Burman, editor, Economics of Architectural Conservation: Based on the Proceedings of a Consultation at King's Manor, 13–14 February 1995 (University of York,Inst. of Advanced Architectural Studies, 1995) Paperback 118 pages. 
Peter Burman, editor, Architecture 1900 (Routledge 1998). Hardback 284 pages. .
Peter Burman, Conserving the Railway Heritage (Taylor & Francis, 1996), paperback, 244 pages. .
Peter Burman, "The Revival of Lime for Cathedral Repairs", Lime News, Vol. 4 No. 2 (The Building Limes Forum, 1996).
Leo Schmidt, Peter Burman, Christian Keller: Looking Forwards: The Country House in Contemporary Research and Conservation,: Proceedings of the Conference in York in 1999. Cottbus 2001.
Peter Burman and Enrico Fodde, editors, This Common Bond: Training Cathedral Craftsmen and Conservators for the Next Generation (University of York, 2001) .
Peter Burman, "Das Schöne mit dem Nützliche: Englische Vorbilder und Einflüsse auf die Potsdamer Parklandschaft", in Nichts gedeiht ohne Pflege: Die Potsdamer Parklandschaft und ihre Gärtner (Potsdam: Stiftung Preußischer Schlösser und Gärten Berlin-Brandenburg, 2001).
Peter Burman, editor, Celebrating Conservation: 30 Years of Conservation Studies at the University of York (University of York, 2002) .
Peter Burman, "Noble ideal or political football?: A personal view of the World Heritage Convention and aspects of its progress during the past thirty years", in Jahrbuch, Stiftung Preußischer Schlösser und Gärten Berlin-Brandenburg, Band 4: 2001/2002 (Berlin: Akademie Verlag, 2003).
Peter Burman, "Chapter 23: Decoration, Furnishings and Art since 1900". In Derek Keene, Arthur Burns and Andrew Saint, St. Paul's: The Cathedral Church of London, 604–2004 (Yale University Press. 2004) .
Peter Burman, "Conservation Philosophy in Practice: A Scottish Perspective" in Architectural Heritage XVII: The Journal of the Architectural Heritage Society of Scotland (Edinburgh University Press, 2006).
Peter Burman, "Introduction", in Quiet Hands: A Retrospective of Arts & Crafts Furniture Maker Nicholas Hobbs (William Morris Gallery, 2010).
Peter Burman, "Reconstruction in Theory and Practice:Reflections from a British Perspective" in Uta Hassler and Winfried Nerdinger (editors), Das Prinzip Rekonstruktion (vdf Hochschulverlag AG an der ETH Zurich, 2010) . 
Peter Burman, "Judith Scott, obituary." The Guardian, 7 July 2011.
Peter Burman and Dennis Rodwell, "The Contribution of the United Kingdom to European Architectural Heritage Year 1975", in A Future for our Past: The 40th Anniversary of European Architectural Heritage Year (1975–2015) (Berlin: Hendrik Bäßler Verlag, 2015), pp 262–275).
Peter Burman, "Prophet of Preservation" [i.e. John Ruskin] in the SPAB Magazine, Winter 2018 (Society for the Protection of Ancient Buildings).
Peter Burman, "Robert and Eve Baker: A Tribute" in The Journal of the Building Limes Forum, Volume 25, 2018.
Peter Burman, "Historic Organs as Mainstream Cultural Heritage" in BIOS Journal Volume 43 (British Institute of Organ Studies, 2019).
Peter Burman, Chapter 3 "Abercorn House and Churchyard and the Hopetoun Mausoleum", and Chapter 4 "The Useful and Beautiful on the Hopetoun Estate", in Countess of Hopetoun, Polly Feversham and Leo Schmidt (editors), Hopetoun, Scotland's Finest Stately Home (Hirmer Verlag GmbH, Munich, 2020) .

References

External links
Personal website (archived by the Internet Archive as at January 2019.
"Dr. Peter Burman - Philip Webb (1831-1915)" YouTube.

English architectural historians
Members of the Order of the British Empire
1944 births
Living people
Academics of the University of York
Academic staff of the Brandenburg University of Technology
Alumni of King's College, Cambridge
Fellows of the Society of Antiquaries of London
Guild of St George
British archivists